Super Charm-Tau factory (SCT) is an electron–positron collider being designed and built by Budker Institute of Nuclear Physics in Novosibirsk. Its main goal is to study the CP-violation in the processes involving charmed hadrons, to investigate decays of the τ-lepton as well as to search for new forms of matter: glueballs, dark matter, etc.

The electrons will be partially polarized. The synchrotron will be operating for 10 years. The particle registration and measurements will done using a universal high performance magnetic detector with the field strength of 1–1.5 Tesla.

The SCT project is one Megascience class projects being built in Russia.

See also
Beijing Electron–Positron Collider II
Belle II
PANDA experiment

References

Particle physics facilities
Particle experiments